At least two warships of Japan have borne the name Urakaze:

 an  launched in 1915 and sunk in 1945.
 a  launched in 1940 and sunk in 1944.

Japanese Navy ship names
Imperial Japanese Navy ship names